Goa, Daman & Diu Legislative Assembly election, 1972 was held in Indian Union territory of Goa, Daman and Diu in 1972, to elect 30 members to the Goa, Daman & Diu Legislative Assembly.

Results

|- align=center
!style="background-color:#E9E9E9" class="unsortable"|
!style="background-color:#E9E9E9" align=center|Political Party
!style="background-color:#E9E9E9" |Seats contested
!style="background-color:#E9E9E9" |Seats won
!style="background-color:#E9E9E9" |Number of Votes
!style="background-color:#E9E9E9" |% of Votes
!style="background-color:#E9E9E9" |Seat change
|-
| 
|align="left"|Maharashtrawadi Gomantak Party||23||18||116,855||38.30%|| 2
|-
|
|align="left"|United Goans Party (Superia Group)||26||10||99,156||32.50%|| 2
|-
| 
|align="left"|Indian National Congress||19||1||41,612||13.64%|| 1
|-
| 
|align="left"|Independents||36||1||28,874||9.64%|| 1
|-
|
|align="left"|Total||138||30||305,077||
|-
|}

Winning candidates

By Elections

References

External links

1972
1972 State Assembly elections in India
1970s in Goa, Daman and Diu
1972